Lap pla duk (catfish larb) is a kind of larb which is a northern Thai dish. Lap pla duk is served with sticky rice and juices.

External links
 chowhound by ThaiNut   http://www.chowhound.com/post/catfish-larb-split-greater-asia-board-481812
 Eatingthaifood    https://www.eatingthaifood.com/thai-catfish-salad/

Thai cuisine